Adela María Ruiz González , customary married name Ruiz de Royo (December 15, 1943 – June 19, 2019) was a Spanish-born Panamanian mathematics academic and educator. She served as the First Lady of Panama  from 1978 until 1982 during the presidency of her husband, Aristides Royo. She also served President of the Panamanian Academy of Language (Academia Panameña de la Lengua).

Biography
Ruiz was born Adela María Ruiz González in a home in the municipality of Grado, Asturias, Spain to parents, José María and Rosalina. She was raised in the nearby city of Oviedo alongside her three sisters, Marta, Mabel, and María José. Ruiz was nicknamed Deli.

By 1960, Ruiz had moved to Salamanca to study medicine. That same year, she met her future husband, a Panamanian national and fellow student at the University of Salamanca named Aristides Royo. The couple married in the early 1960s and eventually had three children - Marta Elena, Irma Natalia, and Aristides José. Ruiz, Royo and their oldest daughter, Marta, moved to Panama permanently on September 17, 1965.

In addition to her own career, Ruiz held the role of the wife of a government minister and politician. She became First Lady of Panama from 1978 to 1982. During her tenure as first lady, Ruiz created the Asociación Pro Obras de Beneficencia.

Ruiz was diagnosed with colon and liver cancer in 2017. She died from the disease on June 19, 2019, at the age of 75. Adela Ruiz was survived by her husband, Aristides Royo, and their three children, Marta Elena, Natalia, and Arístides José. Her funeral was held at the National Sanctuary in Bella Vista, Panama City on June 24, 2019. Ruiz's ashes were returned to her native Spain, where they were partially buried at the Praviano cemetery in Riberas, Asturias.  A second funeral mass was held at the Carmelite Catholic Church of Oviedo on October 4, 2019. Shortly before the funeral, her remaining ashes were sprinkled into the Cantabrian Sea by her husband and children.

In December 2019, Ruiz's daughter, Natalia Royo de Hagerman, was appointed as Panama's ambassador to the United Kingdom.

References

2019 deaths
First ladies and gentlemen of Panama
Panamanian educators
Panamanian academic administrators
Panamanian mathematicians
Women mathematicians
Mathematics educators
University of Salamanca alumni
Spanish emigrants to Panama
Panamanian people of Asturian descent
People from Oviedo
1943 births
Panamanian women scientists